Fabienne Diato-Pasetti (b. October 4, 1965 in La Colle, Monaco) is a Monégasque Olympic rifle shooter, who specializes in the 10 metre air rifle advent. She has competed in the 1988, 1992, 1996, 2000, 2004, and the 2008 Summer Olympics. Diato-Pasetti is one of only sixteen shooters to compete in at least six Olympic Games. She was also the first woman to represent Monaco at the Olympics.

See also
 List of athletes with the most appearances at Olympic Games

References

External links
 Sports-Reference Profile
 Olympic Athlete Profile 

1965 births
Living people
Monegasque female sport shooters
Olympic shooters of Monaco
ISSF rifle shooters
Shooters at the 1988 Summer Olympics
Shooters at the 1992 Summer Olympics
Shooters at the 1996 Summer Olympics
Shooters at the 2000 Summer Olympics
Shooters at the 2004 Summer Olympics
Shooters at the 2008 Summer Olympics